Riemann's Theorem or Riemann Theorem may refer to:
 Riemann's theorem on conformal mappings.
 Riemann's theorem on removable singularities.
 Riemann's theorem on the rearrangement of terms of a series.